Richmond Hill High School may refer to:

Richmond Hill High School (Georgia), in Richmond Hill
Richmond Hill High School (Ontario), in Richmond Hill
Richmond Hill High School (Queens), in New York